Yoandry Iriarte Galvez (born May 5, 1986) is a Cuban fencer. He competed in the men's sabre event at the 2016 Summer Olympics, and was eliminated in the first round by world no. 2 Kim Jung-hwan after a 15-7 loss.

He qualified by placing second (out of 14) in the American continental qualifying tournament, despite being ranked 137th worldwide. He was Cuba's only fencer at the Games, and their first Olympic fencer since 2008.

References

External links
 

1986 births
Living people
Cuban male sabre fencers
Olympic fencers of Cuba
Fencers at the 2016 Summer Olympics
Sportspeople from Havana